Pantages Theatre  may refer to:

Pantages Theatre (Fresno, California), now Warnors Theatre
Arcade Theater, Downtown Los Angeles a.k.a. Pantages Theatre as it was on the Pantages Vaudeville circuit
Pantages Theatre (Hollywood), Los Angeles, California
Pantages Theatre (Minneapolis)
Pantages Theater (Tacoma, Washington)
Pantages Theatre (Toronto), Ontario, now Ed Mirvish Theatre (formerly Canon Theatre)
Pantages Theatre (Salt Lake City), Utah
Pantages Theatre (Vancouver), British Columbia
Pantages Theatre (Victoria), British Columbia, now McPherson Playhouse
Pantages Theatre (Winnipeg), Manitoba, now Pantages Playhouse Theatre